Young-ho, also spelled Yong-ho, is a Korean masculine given name. The meaning differs based on the hanja used to write each syllable of the name. There are 34 hanja with the reading "young" and 49 hanja with the reading "ho" on the South Korean government's official list of hanja which may be used in given names. Young-ho was a highly popular name in the mid-20th century: according to South Korean government data, it was the most common name for newborn boys in 1940, falling to second place by 1950 and third place in 1960.

People with this name include:

Entertainers
Kim Young-ho (actor) (born 1967), South Korean actor
Flash (gamer) (born Lee Young-ho, 1992), South Korean professional StarCraft player

Sportspeople
Kim Young-ho (born 1971), South Korean foil fencer
Pak Yong-ho (born 1974), South Korean football defender (J2 League)
Jung Young-ho (born 1982), South Korean freestyle wrestler

Other
Ri Yong-ho (general) (born 1942), North Korean military officer
Thae Yong-ho (born 1962), North Korean diplomat who defected to South Korea in 2016
Yoo Young-ho (born 1965), South Korean sculptor
Heo Young-ho (born 1986), South Korean professional Go player

See also
List of Korean given names

References

Korean masculine given names